Fire ecology is a scientific discipline concerned with natural processes involving fire in an ecosystem and the ecological effects, the interactions between fire and the abiotic and biotic components of an ecosystem, and the role as an ecosystem process. Many ecosystems, particularly prairie, savanna, chaparral and coniferous forests, have evolved with fire as an essential contributor to habitat vitality and renewal. Many plant species in fire-affected environments use fire to germinate, establish, or to reproduce. Wildfire suppression not only endangers these species, but also the animals that depend upon them.

Wildfire suppression campaigns in the United States have historically molded public opinion to believe that wildfires are harmful to nature. Ecological research has shown, however, that fire is an integral component in the function and biodiversity of many natural habitats, and that the organisms within these communities have adapted to withstand, and even to exploit, natural wildfire.  More generally, fire is now regarded as a 'natural disturbance', similar to flooding, windstorms, and landslides, that has driven the evolution of species and controls the characteristics of ecosystems.

Fire suppression, in combination with other human-caused environmental changes, may have resulted in unforeseen consequences for natural ecosystems. Some large wildfires in the United States have been blamed on years of fire suppression and the continuing expansion of people into fire-adapted ecosystems as well as climate change. Land managers are faced with tough questions regarding how to restore a natural fire regime, but allowing wildfires to burn is likely the least expensive and most effective method in many situations.

Fire components

A fire regime describes the characteristics of fire and how it interacts with a particular ecosystem. Its "severity" is a term that ecologists use to refer to the impact that a fire has on an ecosystem. It is usually studied using tools such as remote sensing which can detect burned area estimates, severity and fire risk associated with an area. Ecologists can define this in many ways, but one way is through an estimate of plant mortality. Fire can burn at three levels. Ground fires will burn through soil that is rich in organic matter. Surface fires will burn through dead plant material that is lying on the ground. Crown fires will burn in the tops of shrubs and trees. Ecosystems generally experience a mix of all three.

Fires will often break out during a dry season, but in some areas wildfires may also commonly occur during a time of year when lightning is prevalent. The frequency over a span of years at which fire will occur at a particular location is a measure of how common wildfires are in a given ecosystem. It is either defined as the average interval between fires at a given site, or the average interval between fires in an equivalent specified area.

Defined as the energy released per unit length of fireline (kW m−1), wildfire intensity can be estimated either as

 the product of 
the linear spread rate (m s−1), 
 the low heat of combustion (kJ kg−1),
  and the combusted fuel mass per unit area, 
or it can be estimated from the flame length.

Abiotic responses
Fires can affect soils through heating and combustion processes. Depending on the temperatures of the soils caused by the combustion processes, different effects will happen- from evaporation of water at the lower temperature ranges, to the combustion of soil organic matter and formation of pyrogenic organic matter, otherwise known as charcoal.

Fires can cause changes in soil nutrients through a variety of mechanisms, which include oxidation, volatilization, erosion, and leaching by water, but the event must usually be of high temperatures for significant loss of nutrients to occur. However, quantity of nutrients available in soils are usually increased due to the ash that is generated, and this is made quickly available, as opposed to the slow release of nutrients by decomposition. Rock spalling (or thermal exfoliation) accelerates weathering of rock and potentially the release of some nutrients.

Increase in the pH of the soil following a fire is commonly observed, most likely due to the formation of calcium carbonate, and the subsequent decomposition of this calcium carbonate to calcium oxide when temperatures get even higher. It could also be due to the increased cation content in the soil due to the ash, which temporarily increases soil pH. Microbial activity in the soil might also increase due to the heating of soil and increased nutrient content in the soil, though studies have also found complete loss of microbes on the top layer of soil after a fire. Overall, soils become more basic (higher pH) following fires because of acid combustion. By driving novel chemical reactions at high temperatures, fire can even alter the texture and structure of soils by affecting the clay content and the soil's porosity.

Removal of vegetation following a fire can cause several effects on the soil, such as increasing the temperatures of the soil during the day due to increased solar radiation on the soil surface, and greater cooling due to loss of radiative heat at night. Fewer leaves to intercept rain will also cause more rain to reach the soil surface, and with fewer plants to absorb the water, the amount of water content in the soils might increase. However, it might be seen that ash can be water repellent when dry, and therefore water content and availability might not actually increase.

Biotic responses and adaptations

Plants

Plants have evolved many adaptations to cope with fire.  Of these adaptations, one of the best-known is likely pyriscence, where maturation and release of seeds is triggered, in whole or in part, by fire or smoke; this behaviour is often erroneously called serotiny, although this term truly denotes the much broader category of seed release activated by any stimulus.  All pyriscent plants are serotinous, but not all serotinous plants are pyriscent (some are necriscent, hygriscent, xeriscent, soliscent, or some combination thereof).  On the other hand, germination of seed activated by trigger is not to be confused with pyriscence; it is known as physiological dormancy.

In chaparral communities in Southern California, for example, some plants have leaves coated in flammable oils that encourage an intense fire. This heat causes their fire-activated seeds to germinate (an example of dormancy) and the young plants can then capitalize on the lack of competition in a burnt landscape. Other plants have smoke-activated seeds, or fire-activated buds. The cones of the Lodgepole pine (Pinus contorta) are, conversely, pyriscent: they are sealed with a resin that a fire melts away, releasing the seeds. Many plant species, including the shade-intolerant giant sequoia (Sequoiadendron giganteum), require fire to make gaps in the vegetation canopy that will let in light, allowing their seedlings to compete with the more shade-tolerant seedlings of other species, and so establish themselves. Because their stationary nature precludes any fire avoidance, plant species may only be fire-intolerant, fire-tolerant or fire-resistant.

Fire intolerance
Fire-intolerant plant species tend to be highly flammable and are destroyed completely by fire. Some of these plants and their seeds may simply fade from the community after a fire and not return; others have adapted to ensure that their offspring survives into the next generation. "Obligate seeders" are plants with large, fire-activated seed banks that germinate, grow, and mature rapidly following a fire, in order to reproduce and renew the seed bank before the next fire.
Seeds may contain the receptor protein KAI2, that is activated by the growth hormones karrikin released by the fire.

Fire tolerance
Fire-tolerant species are able to withstand a degree of burning and continue growing despite damage from fire. These plants are sometimes referred to as "resprouters". Ecologists have shown that some species of resprouters store extra energy in their roots to aid recovery and re-growth following a fire. For example, after an Australian bushfire, the Mountain Grey Gum tree (Eucalyptus cypellocarpa) starts producing a mass of shoots of leaves from the base of the tree all the way up the trunk towards the top, making it look like a black stick completely covered with young, green leaves.

Fire resistance
Fire-resistant plants suffer little damage during a characteristic fire regime. These include large trees whose flammable parts are high above surface fires. Mature ponderosa pine (Pinus ponderosa) is an example of a tree species that suffers little to no crown damage during a low severity fire because it sheds its lower, vulnerable branches as it matures.

Animals, birds and microbes

Like plants, animals display a range of abilities to cope with fire, but they differ from most plants in that they must avoid the actual fire to survive. Although birds may be vulnerable when nesting, they are generally able to escape a fire; indeed they often profit from being able to take prey fleeing from a fire and to recolonize burned areas quickly afterwards. In fact, many wildlife species globally are dependent on recurring fires in fire-dependent ecosystems to create and maintain habitat. Some anthropological and ethno-ornithological evidence suggests that certain species of fire-foraging raptors may engage in intentional fire propagation to flush out prey. Mammals are often capable of fleeing a fire, or seeking cover if they can burrow. Amphibians and reptiles may avoid flames by burrowing into the ground or using the burrows of other animals. Amphibians in particular are able to take refuge in water or very wet mud.

Some arthropods also take shelter during a fire, although the heat and smoke may actually attract some of them, to their peril. Microbial organisms in the soil vary in their heat tolerance but are more likely to be able to survive a fire the deeper they are in the soil. A low fire intensity, a quick passing of the flames and a dry soil will also help. An increase in available nutrients after the fire has passed may result in larger microbial communities than before the fire. The generally greater heat tolerance of bacteria relative to fungi makes it possible for soil microbial population diversity to change following a fire, depending on the severity of the fire, the depth of the microbes in the soil, and the presence of plant cover. Certain species of fungi, such as Cylindrocarpon destructans appear to be unaffected by combustion contaminants, which can inhibit re-population of burnt soil by other microorganisms, and therefore have a higher chance of surviving fire disturbance and then recolonizing and out-competing other fungal species afterwards.

Fire and ecological succession
Fire behavior is different in every ecosystem and the organisms in those ecosystems have adapted accordingly. One sweeping generality is that in all ecosystems, fire creates a mosaic of different habitat patches, with areas ranging from those having just been burned to those that have been untouched by fire for many years. This is a form of ecological succession in which a freshly burned site will progress through continuous and directional phases of colonization following the destruction caused by the fire.  Ecologists usually characterize succession through the changes in vegetation that successively arise. After a fire, the first species to re-colonize will be those with seeds are already present in the soil, or those with seeds are able to travel into the burned area quickly. These are generally fast-growing herbaceous plants that require light and are intolerant of shading. As time passes, more slowly growing, shade-tolerant woody species will suppress some of the herbaceous plants. Conifers are often early successional species, while broad leaf trees frequently replace them in the absence of fire. Hence, many conifer forests are themselves dependent upon recurring fire. Both natural and human fires affect all ecosystems from peatlands to shrublands to forests and tropical landscapes. This impacts the way that the ecosystem is structured and functions. Though there have always been wildfires naturally, the frequency of wildfires has increased at a rapid rate in recent years. This is largely due to decreases in precipitation, increases in temperature, and increases in human ignitions.

Different species of plants, animals, and microbes specialize in exploiting different stages in this process of succession, and by creating these different types of patches, fire allows a greater number of species to exist within a landscape. Soil characteristics will be a factor in determining the specific nature of a fire-adapted ecosystem, as will climate and topography.  Different frequencies of fire also result in different successional pathways; short intervals between fires often eliminate tree species due to the time required to rebuild a seed bank, resulting in replacement by lighter seeded species like grasses and forbs 

https://www.ipcc.ch/report/ar6/wg3/

Examples of fire in different ecosystems

Forests

Mild to moderate fires burn in the forest understory, removing small trees and herbaceous groundcover. High-severity fires will burn into the crowns of the trees and kill most of the dominant vegetation. Crown fires may require support from ground fuels to maintain the fire in the forest canopy (passive crown fires), or the fire may burn in the canopy independently of any ground fuel support (an active crown fire). High-severity fire creates complex early seral forest habitat, or snag forest with high levels of biodiversity. When a forest burns frequently and thus has less plant litter build-up, below-ground soil temperatures rise only slightly and will not be lethal to roots that lie deep in the soil. Although other characteristics of a forest will influence the impact of fire upon it, factors such as climate and topography play an important role in determining fire severity and fire extent. Fires spread most widely during drought years, are most severe on upper slopes and are influenced by the type of vegetation that is growing.

Forests in British Columbia
In Canada, forests cover about 10% of the land area and yet harbor 70% of the country’s bird and terrestrial mammal species. Natural fire regimes are important in maintaining a diverse assemblage of vertebrate species in up to twelve different forest types in British Columbia. Different species have adapted to exploit the different stages of succession, regrowth and habitat change that occurs following an episode of burning, such as downed trees and debris. The characteristics of the initial fire, such as its size and intensity, cause the habitat to evolve differentially afterwards and influence how vertebrate species are able to use the burned areas. The change in forest fire intensity over time has been studied for the period since 1600 in an area of central British Columbia and is consistent with fire suppression since regulation was introduced.

Shrublands

Shrub fires typically concentrate in the canopy and spread continuously if the shrubs are close enough together. Shrublands are typically dry and are prone to accumulations of highly volatile fuels, especially on hillsides. Fires will follow the path of least moisture and the greatest amount of dead fuel material. Surface and below-ground soil temperatures during a burn are generally higher than those of forest fires because the centers of combustion lie closer to the ground, although this can vary greatly. Common plants in shrubland or chaparral include manzanita, chamise and coyote brush.

California shrublands
California shrubland, commonly known as chaparral, is a widespread plant community of low growing species, typically on arid sloping areas of the California Coast Ranges or western foothills of the Sierra Nevada. There are a number of common shrubs and tree shrub forms in this association, including salal, toyon, coffeeberry and Western poison oak. Regeneration following a fire is usually a major factor in the association of these species.

South African Fynbos shrublands
Fynbos shrublands occur in a small belt across South Africa. The plant species in this ecosystem are highly diverse, yet the majority of these species are obligate seeders, that is, a fire will cause germination of the seeds and the plants will begin a new life-cycle because of it. These plants may have coevolved into obligate seeders as a response to fire and nutrient-poor soils. Because fire is common in this ecosystem and the soil has limited nutrients, it is most efficient for plants to produce many seeds and then die in the next fire. Investing a lot of energy in roots to survive the next fire when those roots will be able to extract little extra benefit from the nutrient-poor soil would be less efficient. It is possible that the rapid generation time that these obligate seeders display has led to more rapid evolution and speciation in this ecosystem, resulting in its highly diverse plant community.

Grasslands
Grasslands burn more readily than forest and shrub ecosystems, with the fire moving through the stems and leaves of herbaceous plants and only lightly heating the underlying soil, even in cases of high intensity. In most grassland ecosystems, fire is the primary mode of decomposition, making it crucial in the recycling of nutrients. In some grassland systems, fire only became the primary mode of decomposition after the disappearance of large migratory herds of browsing or grazing megafauna driven by predator pressure. In the absence of functional communities of large migratory herds of herbivorous megafauna and attendant predators, overuse of fire to maintain grassland ecosystems may lead to excessive oxidation, loss of carbon, and desertification in susceptible climates. Some grassland ecosystems respond poorly to fire.

North American grasslands
In North America fire-adapted invasive grasses such as Bromus tectorum contribute to increased fire frequency which exerts selective pressure against native species. This is a concern for grasslands in the Western United States.

In less arid grassland presettlement fires worked in concert with grazing to create a healthy grassland ecosystem as indicated by the accumulation of soil organic matter significantly altered by fire. The tallgrass prairie ecosystem in the Flint Hills of eastern Kansas and Oklahoma is responding positively to the current use of fire in combination with grazing.

South African savanna
In the savanna of South Africa, recently burned areas have new growth that provides palatable and nutritious forage compared to older, tougher grasses. This new forage attracts large herbivores from areas of unburned and grazed grassland that has been kept short by constant grazing. On these unburned "lawns", only those plant species adapted to heavy grazing are able to persist; but the distraction provided by the newly burned areas allows grazing-intolerant grasses to grow back into the lawns that have been temporarily abandoned, so allowing these species to persist within that ecosystem.

Longleaf pine savannas

Much of the southeastern United States was once open longleaf pine forest with a rich understory of grasses, sedges, carnivorous plants and orchids. These ecosystems had the highest fire frequency of any habitat, once per decade or less. Without fire, deciduous forest trees invade, and their shade eliminates both the pines and the understory.  Some of the typical plants associated with fire include yellow pitcher plant and rose pogonia. The abundance and diversity of such plants is closely related to fire frequency. Rare animals such as gopher tortoises and indigo snakes also depend upon these open grasslands and flatwoods.  Hence, the restoration of fire is a priority to maintain species composition and biological diversity.

Fire in wetlands
Many kinds of wetlands are also influenced by fire. 
This usually occurs during periods of drought.
In landscapes with peat soils, such as bogs, the peat substrate itself may burn, leaving holes that refill with water as new ponds. 
Fires that are less intense will remove accumulated litter and allow other wetland plants to regenerate from buried seeds, or from rhizomes.
Wetlands that are influenced by fire include coastal marshes, wet prairies, peat bogs, floodplains, prairie marshes and flatwoods. 
Since wetlands can store large amounts of carbon in peat, the fire frequency of vast northern peatlands is linked to processes controlling the carbon dioxide levels of the atmosphere, and to the phenomenon of global warming. 
Dissolved organic carbon (DOC) is abundant in wetlands and plays a critical role in their ecology. In the Florida Everglades, a significant portion of the DOC is "dissolved charcoal" indicating that fire can play a critical role in wetland ecosystems.

Fire suppression

Fire serves many important functions within fire-adapted ecosystems. Fire plays an important role in nutrient cycling, diversity maintenance and habitat structure. The suppression of fire can lead to unforeseen changes in ecosystems that often adversely affect the plants, animals and humans that depend upon that habitat. Wildfires that deviate from a historical fire regime because of fire suppression are called "uncharacteristic fires".

Chaparral communities

In 2003, southern California witnessed powerful chaparral wildfires. Hundreds of homes and hundreds of thousands of acres of land went up in flames. Extreme fire weather (low humidity, low fuel moisture and high winds) and the accumulation of dead plant material from eight years of drought, contributed to a catastrophic outcome. Although some have maintained that fire suppression contributed to an unnatural buildup of fuel loads, a detailed analysis of historical fire data has showed that this may not have been the case. Fire suppression activities had failed to exclude fire from the southern California chaparral. Research showing differences in fire size and frequency between southern California and Baja has been used to imply that the larger fires north of the border are the result of fire suppression, but this opinion has been challenged by numerous investigators and ecologists.

One consequence of the fires in 2003 has been the increased density of invasive and non-native plant species that have quickly colonized burned areas, especially those that had already been burned in the previous 15 years. Because shrubs in these communities are adapted to a particular historical fire regime, altered fire regimes may change the selective pressures on plants and favor invasive and non-native species that are better able to exploit the novel post-fire conditions.

Fish impacts
The Boise National Forest is a US national forest located north and east of the city of Boise, Idaho. Following several uncharacteristically large wildfires, an immediately negative impact on fish populations was observed, posing particular danger to small and isolated fish populations. In the long term, however, fire appears to rejuvenate fish habitats by causing hydraulic changes that increase flooding and lead to silt removal and the deposition of a favorable habitat substrate. This leads to larger post-fire populations of the fish that are able to recolonize these improved areas.

Fire as a management tool

Restoration ecology is the name given to an attempt to reverse or mitigate some of the changes that humans have caused to an ecosystem. Controlled burning is one tool that is currently receiving considerable attention as a means of restoration and management. Applying fire to an ecosystem may create habitats for species that have been negatively impacted by fire suppression, or fire may be used as a way of controlling invasive species without resorting to herbicides or pesticides. However, there is debate as to what land managers should aim to restore their ecosystems to, especially as to whether it be pre-human or pre-European conditions. Native American use of fire, along with natural fire, historically maintained the diversity of the savannas of North America. When, how, and where managers should use fire as a management tool is a subject of debate.

The Great Plains shortgrass prairie

A combination of heavy livestock grazing and fire-suppression has drastically altered the structure, composition, and diversity of the shortgrass prairie ecosystem on the Great Plains, allowing woody species to dominate many areas and promoting fire-intolerant invasive species. In semi-arid ecosystems where the decomposition of woody material is slow, fire is crucial for returning nutrients to the soil and allowing the grasslands to maintain their high productivity.

Although fire can occur during the growing or the dormant seasons, managed fire during the dormant season is most effective at increasing the grass and forb cover, biodiversity and plant nutrient uptake in shortgrass prairies. Managers must also take into account, however, how invasive and non-native species respond to fire if they want to restore the integrity of a native ecosystem. For example, fire can only control the invasive spotted knapweed (Centaurea maculosa) on the Michigan tallgrass prairie in the summer, because this is the time in the knapweed's life cycle that is most important to its reproductive growth.

Mixed conifer forests in the US Sierra Nevada
Mixed conifer forests in the United States Sierra Nevada used to have fire return intervals that ranged from 5 years up to 300 years, depending on the locale. Lower elevations tended to have more frequent fire return intervals, whilst higher and wetter sites saw longer intervals between fires. Native Americans tended to set fires during fall and winter, and land at higher elevations was generally occupied by Native Americans only during the summer.

Finnish boreal forests 
The decline of habitat area and quality has caused many species populations to be red-listed by the International Union for Conservation of Nature. According to a study on forest management of Finnish boreal forests, improving the habitat quality of areas outside reserves can help in conservation efforts of endangered deadwood-dependent beetles. These beetles and various types of fungi both need dead trees in order to survive. Old growth forests can provide this particular habitat. However, most Fennoscandian boreal forested areas are used for timber and therefore are unprotected. The use of controlled burning and tree retention of a forested area with deadwood was studied and its effect on the endangered beetles. The study found that after the first year of management the number of species increased in abundance and richness compared to pre-fire treatment. The abundance of beetles continued to increase the following year in sites where tree retention was high and deadwood was abundant. The correlation between forest fire management and increased beetle populations shows a key to conserving these red-listed species.

Australian eucalypt forests
Much of the old growth eucalypt forest in Australia is designated for conservation. Management of these forests is important because species like Eucalyptus grandis rely on fire to survive. There are a few eucalypt species that do not have a lignotuber, a root swelling structure that contains buds where new shoots can then sprout. During a fire a lignotuber is helpful in the reestablishment of the plant. Because some eucalypts do not have this particular mechanism, forest fire management can be helpful by creating rich soil, killing competitors, and allowing seeds to be released.

Management policies

United States
Fire policy in the United States involves the federal government, individual state governments, tribal governments, interest groups, and the general public. The new federal outlook on fire policy parallels advances in ecology and is moving towards the view that many ecosystems depend on disturbance for their diversity and for the proper maintenance of their natural processes. Although human safety is still the number one priority in fire management, new US government objectives include a long-term view of ecosystems. The newest policy allows managers to gauge the relative values of private property and resources in particular situations and to set their priorities accordingly.

One of the primary goals in fire management is to improve public education in order to suppress the "Smokey Bear" fire-suppression mentality and introduce the public to the benefits of regular natural fires.

See also 

 Crown sprouting
 Evolutionary history of plants 
 Fire history
 Peat bog fire
 Pyrophyte
 Keystone species reintroduction: (sufficient) native keystone grazing species in grasslands will promote tree growth, reducing wildfire likelihood

References

Bibliography

Archibald, S., W.J. Bond, W.D. Stock and D.H.K. Fairbanks.2005. Shaping the landscape: fire-grazer interactions in an African Savanna. Ecological Applications 15:96–109.
 
 Begon, M., J.L. Harper and C.R. Townsend. 1996. Ecology: individuals, populations, and communities, Third Edition. Blackwell Science Ltd., Cambridge, Massachusetts, USA.
 
 
 
 DeBano, L.F., D.G. Neary, P.F. Ffolliot. 1998. Fire’s Effects on Ecosystems. John Wiley & Sons, Inc., New York, New York, USA.
 
 
 
 
 Keddy, P.A.  2007. Plants and Vegetation: Origins, Processes, Consequences. Cambridge University Press, Cambridge, UK. 666 p. 
 Keddy, P.A. 2010. Wetland Ecology: Principles and Conservation (2nd edition). Cambridge University Press, Cambridge, UK. 497 p. 
 
 
 Keeley J.E., Bond W.J., Bradstock R.A., Pausas J.G. & Rundel P.W. 2012. Fire in Mediterranean Ecosystems: Ecology, Evolution and Management. Cambridge University Press.Link
 
 Kramp, B.A., D.R. Patton, and W.W. Brady. 1986. Run wild: wildlife/habitat relationships. U.S. Forest Service, Southwestern Region.
 
 
 
 
 Pyne, S.J.  "How Plants Use Fire (And Are Used By It)." 2002. PBS NOVA Online. 1 January 2006. https://www.pbs.org/wgbh/nova/fire/plants.html.
 
Allan Savory; Jody Butterfield (10 November 2016). Holistic Management, Third Edition: A Commonsense Revolution to Restore Our Environment. Island Press. .
 
 United States Department of Fish and Agriculture (USDA) Forest Service. www.fs.fed.us.
Federal Wildland Fire Management Policy and Program Review (FWFMP).
http://www.fs.fed.us/land/wdfire.htm.
 United States National Park Service (USNPS). www.nps.gov.
Sequoia and King’s Canyon National Parks. 13 February 2006. "Giant Sequoias and Fire."
https://www.nps.gov/seki/learn/nature/fic_segi.htm
 Vitt, D.H., L.A. Halsey and B.J. Nicholson. 2005. The Mackenzie River basin. pp. 166–202 in L.H. Fraser and P.A. Keddy (eds.). The World’s Largest Wetlands: Ecology and Conservation. Cambridge University Press, Cambridge, UK. 488 p.
 Whitlock, C., Higuera, P. E., McWethy, D. B., & Briles, C. E. 2010. Paleoecological perspectives on fire ecology: revisiting the fire-regime concept. Open Ecology Journal 3: 6-23.
 Wisheu, I.C., M.L. Rosenzweig, L. Olsvig-Whittaker, A. Shmida. 2000. What makes nutrient-poor Mediterranean heathlands so rich in plant diversity? Evolutionary Ecology Research 2: 935-955.

External links

US Forest Service: Fire Ecology
Yellowstone National Park: Fire Ecology
The Nature Conservancy's web site for fire practitioners- Fire Ecology
The Nature Conservancy: Why We Work with Fire
The International Journal of Wildland Fire
Fire Ecology Journal
Fire and Environmental Research Applications
Word Spy - pyrogeography

 
Forest ecology
Ecological succession
Ecology terminology
Fire
Wildfires
Wildfire suppression
Wildfire prevention
Environmental terminology
Habitat